Henrik Fritzon (born 3 July 1972) is a Swedish politician of the Social Democrats. He was the Chair of the Executive Committee of the Skåne Regional Council from 2014 to 2018.

He is married to Heléne Fritzon, currently the Minister for Migration and Asylum Policy, and they live in Degeberga, Kristianstad Municipality.

References

External links

1972 births
Swedish Social Democratic Party politicians
People from Jönköping Municipality
Living people